António Xavier Machado e Cerveira (Anadia, 1 September 1756-Caxias, 14 September 1828) was a Portuguese organ builder. He is considered one of the most remarkable Portuguese Baroque organ builders.

Built instruments

1756 births
1828 deaths
People from Anadia, Portugal
Portuguese pipe organ builders